César Chesneau, sieur Dumarsais or Du Marsais (July 17, 1676 – June 11, 1756) was a French philosophe,  grammarian and contributor to the Encyclopédie ou Dictionnaire raisonné des sciences, des arts et des métiers.

He was a prominent figure in what became known as the Enlightenment, and contributed to Diderot's Encyclopédie. After his death, Jacques-Philippe-Augustin Douchet and Nicolas Beauzée, who were both teachers at the École royale militaire, took over his work.

Born in Marseille, Dumarsais trained in Paris as a lawyer, before abandoning the bar to pursue the life of the mind, subsisting on occasional law students and later on the meager revenue from a pension in the city's Faubourg-Saint Victor. He wrote clandestine tracts in favour of freethought, attacked the French church in books and pamphlets, and proposed, to no avail, a reform of French orthography. He died infirm; in the words of a eulogy penned for the Encyclopédie by D'Alembert, "he lived poor and ignored by the fatherland he had taught".

Principal works include Méthode raisonné pour apprendre la langue latine (1722) and Principes de grammaire (1769). Traité des Tropes (1730) was an influential early attempt to generate a philosophical theory of figurative language. A seven-volume French edition of his complete known works was published in 1797.

References

External links 
1722: Exposition d’une méthode raisonnée pour apprendre la langue latine, Paris, Étienne Ganeau,
1730: Des tropes ou Des différents sens dans lesquels on peut prendre un même mot dans une même langue, Paris, chez la Veuve de Jean-Batiste Brocas,
1743: Nouvelles libertés de penser, Amsterdam, Piget,
1751: De l’ame, et de son immortalité, Paris, Briasson,
1792: Logique et principes de grammaire Paris : Barrois : Froullé,
1796: Opuscules philosophiques et littéraires, la plupart posthumes ou inédites, Paris, Impr. nationale,
1797: Le philosophe, Paris, Pougin, 
1818: Les tropes de Dumarsais Paris, Belin-le-Prieur, 
 Les véritables principes de la grammaire ou Nouvelle grammaire raisonnée pour apprendre la langue latine, Paris, Hachette, (1971)
 Analyse de la religion chretienne, Paris, Hachette, (1972)

Writers from Marseille
1676 births
1756 deaths
18th-century French philosophers
Contributors to the Encyclopédie (1751–1772)
Philosophers of language
Trope theorists
Grammarians from France